George Edward Russell (9 April 1912 – 28 November 2004) was an Irish politician and company director.

Early life
He was born 9 April 1912 in the family home at 4 Moyola Terrace, Limerick, the eldest of two sons and a daughter of Matthew John Russell and his wife Mary (née Rohan). His grandfather George established a bakery in Limerick in 1870 and represented Irishtown ward on Limerick City Council. His father continued the business and in the 1920s acquired control of Dan O'Connor Ltd, a corn and provisions merchant founded in 1848 by Ted's granduncle.

Russell was educated first at Crescent College in Limerick, and for a short time Mount St Benedict's near Gorey; and at Stonyhurst College in Lancashire. 

From 1930 he played rugby for Bohemians RFC as a second‑row forward, being captain for two seasons (1935–1937), and maintained a lifelong association with Bohemians, serving as club president in 1967–1968. He was selected for Munster Rugby during 1936–1938. In 1938 he had a final trial for Ireland and might have achieved international honours but for the outbreak of World War II, though he believed that he was too lightweight.

Politics
Russell first stood for election as a Clann na Poblachta candidate at the 1948 general election but was not elected. He was also an unsuccessful candidate at the 1951 general election and the 1952 Limerick East by-election. He was first elected to Dáil Éireann as an independent Teachta Dála (TD) for the Limerick East constituency at the 1957 general election. He lost his seat at the 1961 general election. He was elected to the 12th Seanad in 1969 on the Industrial and Commercial Panel and was re-elected to the 13th Seanad in 1973. He was defeated at the 1977 Seanad election. He unsuccessfully contested the 1965 general election as a Fine Gael candidate.

He was a longtime member of Limerick Corporation, elected first as an independent (1942) and later as a member of Gluais Linn (1945), Clann na Poblachta (1950, 1955), and Fine Gael (1960, 1967, 1974, 1979). He served as Mayor of Limerick on five occasions (1954–1957, 1967–1968 and 1976–1977). He was made a Freeman of the city in 1995. and was awarded an honorary doctorate by the University of Limerick in 2002.

He was the President of the Limerick Chamber from 1948 to 1950.

Later life
Russell was active in the campaign for the establishment of a university in Limerick, which led to the establishment of the National Institute for Higher Education (later the University of Limerick) in 1972.

In 1938, he married Dervilla Gleeson of Nenagh, and they had four children.

References

External links
Ted Russell in 'Russell family' file at Limerick City Library, Ireland
Ted Russell in 'Mayors' file at Limerick City Library, Ireland

1912 births
2004 deaths
Clann na Poblachta politicians
Fine Gael politicians
Independent TDs
Mayors of Limerick (city)
Members of the 16th Dáil
Members of the 12th Seanad
Members of the 13th Seanad
Politicians from County Limerick
People educated at Crescent College
People educated at Stonyhurst College
Independent members of Seanad Éireann
Businesspeople from Limerick (city)